is categorized as a potentially hazardous asteroid because it is around 400 meters in diameter and makes close approaches to Earth.

At 1 November 2022 18:26 UT it passed  from Earth. As of 1 November 2022 the uncertainty in the close approach distance was ±. The asteroid should have brighten to about apparent magnitude 14.3 which is roughly the brightness of Pluto and was around 75 degrees from the Sun. It may have been viewable by experienced amateur observers with a telescope that has an aperture of around 8-inches or better.

By 2 November 2022 the asteroid was better placed for the southern hemisphere with a declination of –32. Goldstone Solar System Radar using the Canberra Deep Space Communication Complex 70–meter Deep Space Station 43 and Australia Telescope Compact Array observed the asteroid on 2 November 2022. It then came to perihelion (closest approach to the Sun) on 3 November 2022.

See also 
 List of asteroid close approaches to Earth in 2022 beyond 1 LD
 List of asteroid close approaches to Earth in 2023 beyond 1 LD

Notes

References

External links 
 Animation showing 2022RM4 approach from the Northern Hemisphere and exit the Southern Hemisphere – Tony Dunn
 Potentially Hazardous Asteroid 2022 RM4 close encounter: a image – 14 Oct. 2022
 
 
 



Minor planet object articles (unnumbered)

20220912
20221101